The Immigration Service Ordinance is Chapter 331 of Hong Kong's Ordinances. It was introduced in 1961 as Cap 30 to create the Immigration Department (Hong Kong) which was previously under the control of Hong Kong Police Force since the 1940s.

The Ordinance also resulted in the transfer of Registration of Persons Ordinance 1949 and role of Commissioner of Registration from the Hong Kong Police to Immigration Department.

See also

 Hong Kong Identity Card
 Immigration Department (Hong Kong)
 Right of abode in Hong Kong
 Visa policy of Hong Kong
 Immigration Act 1971 - past at the same time as Hong Kong's ordinance and also dealt with right of abode

References

Hong Kong legislation
Immigration law in Hong Kong